The Bakhchisarai War or Crimean-Circassian War of 1525 was a military conflict between the Crimean Khanate and the Kabardian Principality.

History

Before the war 
Prince Inal had established a strong empire in the fifteenth century uniting all Circassians, and Abkhazians. However, after his death civil war ensued and Prince Idar emerged as the sole potentiate. During his reign, just like his predecessor, the Kabardian Circassians dominated the North Caucasus in the late fifteenth century and early sixteenth century. They established diplomatic contacts with the Ottoman Empire, and the Russians.

The war 
In the late 1520s the Kabardians mounted a campaign against the Crimean Tatars. The Kabardians used their fleet of ships to transport the cavalry and the two-wheeled war chariots across the sea to the Crimean Peninsula. The Kabardians attacked Bakhchisarai, the capital of the Crimean Khanate at the time, located in the southwest of the Peninsula, and were victorious, bringing back great spoil, including 100 chariots packed full with cloth, a precious commodity at the time. Andeimirqan (b. circa 1509), legendary Kabardian hero (the equivalent of Robin Hood in the Circassian ethos), was in the elite force of the Kabardians during the Bakhchisaray Campaign.

References 

16th-century conflicts
16th century in the Crimean Khanate
Wars involving the Circassians
Military operations involving the Crimean Khanate